The  New York Giants season was the franchise's 89th season in the National Football League (NFL), the fourth playing their home games at MetLife Stadium and the tenth under head coach Tom Coughlin.

The Giants attempted to attain a playoff berth after failing to do so in 2012, and be the first team to play the Super Bowl on their own home field, which they share with the New York Jets.

However, they failed to improve on their 9–7 record and were eliminated from playoff contention after their Week 14 loss to the Chargers. The Giants started 0-6, but rallied to win 7 of their last 10, finishing 7-9. This was the Giants' first losing season since 2004.

The Giants became the first team in NFL history to have a five-year era in which they won the Super Bowl in the third year of the era but missed the playoffs in all other years. Five other teams had similar situations where their lone playoff appearances in any five-year stretch were Super Bowl victories; however four of these were won on their fifth year of that stretch:
 New York Jets from 1964 to 1968
 Washington Redskins from 1978 to 1982
 St. Louis Rams from 1995 to 1999
 Baltimore Ravens from 1996 to 2000

The San Francisco 49ers won their Super Bowl on their fourth year of their stretch from 1978 to 1982.

2013 draft class

Notes
 The Giants traded their fourth-round selection (No. 116 overall) and sixth-round selection (No. 187 overall) to the Arizona Cardinals in exchange for the Cardinals' fourth-round selection (No. 110 overall).

Staff

Final roster

Schedule

Preseason

Regular season

Note: Intra-division opponents are in bold text.

Game summaries

Week 1: at Dallas Cowboys

With the loss, the Giants start their season at 0–1. It was their first loss ever in AT&T Stadium since it opened in 2009.

Week 2: vs. Denver Broncos

With the loss, the Giants fell to 0–2. Eli Manning became 0–3 opposed to his brother Peyton. This would be the last time the Manning brothers played against each other in the NFL, with Peyton retiring following the 2015 season.

Week 3: at Carolina Panthers

With the shutout loss, the Giants fell to their first 0–3 start since 1996.

Week 4: at Kansas City Chiefs

With the loss, the Giants fell to their first 0–4 start since 1987 – which coincidentally also followed a Super Bowl victory.

Week 5: vs. Philadelphia Eagles

With the loss, the Giants fell to 0–5, their worst start since the strike-shortened 1987 season and their 1979 season.

Week 6: at Chicago Bears

The Giants fell to the Chicago Bears 27–21, and were 0–6 for the first time since 1976.

Week 7: vs. Minnesota Vikings

This game would give the Giants their first win of the season, and would also mark the only time Josh Freeman would start for the Vikings after transferring from the Tampa Bay Buccaneers.

Week 8: at Philadelphia Eagles

Despite failing to reach the end zone and surrendering a late defensive score, the Giants held off the Eagles for their first road win of the season, ending an eight-game road losing streak. With the win, New York improved to 2–6 on the season. As of the 2022 season, this is the Giants' most recent road win over the Eagles.

Week 10: vs. Oakland Raiders

This game would snap a 5-game losing streak for Giants against AFC teams. They improved to 3–6.

Week 11: vs. Green Bay Packers

With the win, the Giants improved to 4-6. The game was originally scheduled for Sunday Night Football but was flexed to 4:25.

Week 12: vs. Dallas Cowboys

Week 13: at Washington Redskins

Week 14: at San Diego Chargers

With the loss, the Giants fell to 5–8, and were mathematically eliminated from playoff contention for the second straight season, thus rendering them unable to play Super Bowl XLVIII on their home turf.

Week 15: vs. Seattle Seahawks

Eli Manning threw a career high five interceptions during this game. This would be the second season in a row where the Giants were shutout by the top NFC seed in Week 15 (the Giants were shutout 34–0 by the Falcons in 2012).

Week 16: at Detroit Lions

With the win, the Giants placed the Lions out of post-season contention.

Week 17: vs. Washington Redskins

The Giants finished 7–3 following their 0–6 start, and finished 7–9 overall in 2013.

Standings

Division

Conference

References

New York Giants
New York Giants seasons
New York Giants season
21st century in East Rutherford, New Jersey
Meadowlands Sports Complex